The Tarkwa–Bogoso–Ayanfuri Road is  road that is being constructed by the Government of Ghana to link the three mining towns of Tarkwa, Bogoso and Ayanfuri.

References

Roads in Ghana